Pride of the Marines is a 1936 American comedy film directed by D. Ross Lederman.

Cast
 Charles Bickford as Steve Riley
 Florence Rice as Molly Malone
 Robert Allen as Larry Allen
 Thurston Hall as Col. Gage
 Ward Bond as Gunner Brady
 George McKay as Mac McCabe
 Joe Sawyer as Tennessee

References

External links
 
 
 
 

1936 films
1936 comedy films
American comedy films
1930s English-language films
American black-and-white films
Films directed by D. Ross Lederman
Films about the United States Marine Corps
Columbia Pictures films
1930s American films